Eddie Daniels (born October 19, 1941) is an American musician and composer. Although he is best known as a jazz clarinetist, he has also played saxophone and flute as well as classical music on clarinet.

Early life, family and education
Daniels was born in New York City to a Jewish family. His mother emigrated from Romania. He was raised in the Manhattan Beach neighborhood of Brooklyn in New York City.

He became interested in jazz as a teenager when he was impressed by the musicians accompanying singers, such as Frank Sinatra, on recordings. Daniels' first instrument was the alto saxophone. At the age of 13 he was also playing clarinet, and by the age of 15 he had played at the Newport Jazz Festival youth competition.

Career
Daniels has toured and recorded with a variety of bands, small groups and orchestras, and appeared on television many times. He has played with Bucky Pizzarelli, Freddie Hubbard, Billy Joel, Don Patterson, and Richard Davis. DownBeat gave Daniels the New Star on Clarinet Award in 1968.

He was a member for six years of The Thad Jones/Mel Lewis Orchestra, playing tenor saxophone, clarinet and flute.  On the album "Presenting Joe Williams and the Thad Jones/Mel Lewis Jazz Orchestra", his solo on "Evil Man Blues" was mistakenly credited to his colleague Joe Farrell.

Since the 1980s, he has focused mainly on the clarinet. In 1989, he won a Grammy Award for his contribution to the Roger Kellaway arrangement of "Memos from Paradise".

He worked with Gordon Goodwin's Big Phat Band, on the album Swingin' for the Fences, the first album by the band. He was featured in Goodwin's arrangement of Mozart's 40th symphony in G minor on XXL and on the Big Phat Band's album The Phat Pack.

In 2009, Swiss composer and saxophonist Daniel Schnyder composed MATRIX 21, a Concerto for Clarinet and Orchestra, for Daniels and dedicated it to him. It was commissioned by the Orchestre de Chambre de Lausanne (Switzerland) and world-premiered in Lausanne under its artistic director Christian Zacharias in January 2010. The American premiere took place at the Crested Butte Music Festival on July 18, 2010, under the direction of music director Jens Georg Bachmann.

Discography

As leader
 1966 First Prize! (Prestige)
 1968 This Is New (Columbia)
 1973 Flower for All Seasons (Choice)
 1973 Blue Bossa (Candid)
 1977 Brief Encounter (Muse)
 1978 Morning Thunder (Columbia)
 1986 Breakthrough (GRP)
 1987 To Bird with Love (GRP)
 1988 Memos from Paradise (GRP)
 1989 Blackwood (GRP)
 1990 Nepenthe (GRP)
 1991 This Is Now (GRP)
 1992 Benny Rides Again (GRP)
 1993 Brahms: Clarinet Quintet, Op. 115 (Reference)
 1993 Under the Influence (GRP)
 1994 Real Time (Chesky)
 1995 The Five Seasons (Shanachie)
 1997 Beautiful Love (Shanachie)
 1999 Blues for Sabine (EMI)
 2000 Swing Low Sweet Clarinet (Shanachie)
 2004 Crossing the Line (Summit)
 2005 Mean What You Say (IPO)
 2006 Beautiful Love (Shanachie)
 2007 Homecoming: Eddie Daniels Live at the Iridium (IPO)
 2009 A Duet of One (IPO)
 2012 Live at the Library of Congress (IPO)
 2013 Duke at the Roadhouse: Live in Santa Fe (IPO)
 2017 Just Friends: Live at the Village Vangaurd (Resonance)
 2018 Heart of Brazil (Resonance) 
 2020 Night Kisses (Resonance)

As sideman
With The Thad Jones/Mel Lewis Orchestra
 1966 Presenting Joe Williams and the Thad Jones/Mel Lewis Jazz Orchestra
 1967 Live at the Village Vanguard
 1968 Monday Night
 1969 Central Park North
 1969 Swiss Radio Days Jazz Series, Vol. 4: Beasle, 1969
 1970 Consummation
 1970 Jones & Lewis
 1970 Village Vanguard Live Sessions
 1970 Village Vanguard Live Sessions, Vol. 3 same as Live at the Village Vanguard 1967 
 2006 Live on Tour Switzerland

With Bob James
 1975 Two
 1976 Three
 1977 BJ 4
 1977 Heads
 1980 H 
 1981 All Around the Town
 1981 Sign of the Times
 1982 Hands Down
 1983 The Genie: Themes & Variations from the TV Series Taxi
 1984 12

With Freddie Hubbard
 1969 The Hub of Hubbard

With Eric Gale
 1977 Ginseng Woman
 1978 Multiplication
 1979 Part of You

With Jimmy McGriff
 1977 Tailgunner (LRC)
 1978 Outside Looking In

With Billy Joel
 1982 The Nylon Curtain
 1983 An Innocent Man
 1986 The Bridge

With Dave Grusin
 1987 Cinemagic
 1989 The Fabulous Baker Boys
 1991 The Gershwin Connection
1992 GRP All-Star Big Band 
1993 Dave Grusin Presents GRP All-Star Big Band Live!

With Don Sebesky
 1984 Moving Lines 
 1998 I Remember Bill

With Arturo Sandoval
 1996 Swingin'  
 2012 Dear Diz (Every Day I Think of You)

With others
 The Doors of Perception, Dave Pike (Vortex, 1966 [1970])
 Muses for Richard Davis, Richard Davis (MPS, 1969)
 The Return of Don Patterson, Don Patterson (Muse, 1972)
 I Want a Country Man, Dakota Staton (Groove Merchant, 1973)
 Higher Ground, Johnny Hammond (Kudu, 1973)
 Simba, O'Donel Levy (Groove Merchant, 1974)
New Groove, Groove Holmes (Groove Merchant, 1974)
 10 Years Hence, Yusef Lateef (Atlantic, 1974)
 Virgin Land, Airto Moreira (Salvation, 1974)
 Benson & Farrell, George Benson and Joe Farrell (CTI, 1976)
 1976 Living Inside Your Love, Earl Klugh
 1977 Bucky's Bunch, Bucky Pizzarelli
 1978 All Things Beautiful, Jimmy Ponder
 1978 Angie, Angela Bofill
 1978 Simplicity of Expression, Billy Cobham
 1978 The Captain's Journey, Lee Ritenour
 1980 Inflation, Stanley Turrentine
 1981 GB, George Benson
 1989 The French Collection, Fred Hersch
 1990 Cotton Connection, Teresa Brewer
 1994 Life's a Lesson, Ben Sidran
 1996 The Music Inside, Chuck Loeb
 1998 One for My Baby, Joe Williams
 2001 Swingin' for the Fences, Gordon Goodwin's Big Phat Band
 2003 Sing! Sing! Sing!, John Pizzarelli
 2004 A Man and His Music, Claus Ogerman
 2007 Hand of Fire, O'Donel Levy
 2008 Live at the Jazz Standard, Roger Kellaway
 2010 Moody 4B, James Moody

References

External links 

 Official website

Jazz fusion saxophonists
Jazz fusion clarinetists
Third stream saxophonists
Third stream clarinetists
Chamber jazz saxophonists
Chamber jazz clarinetists
Fiorello H. LaGuardia High School alumni
Post-bop saxophonists
Post-bop clarinetists
Hard bop saxophonists
Hard bop clarinetists
American jazz saxophonists
American male saxophonists
American jazz clarinetists
American people of Romanian-Jewish descent
Musicians from Brooklyn
Jewish American musicians
1941 births
Living people
GRP Records artists
Muse Records artists
Chesky Records artists
People from Brighton Beach
Jewish jazz musicians
Jazz musicians from New York (state)
21st-century American saxophonists
21st-century clarinetists
21st-century American male musicians
American male jazz musicians
GRP All-Star Big Band members
The Thad Jones/Mel Lewis Orchestra members
21st-century American Jews